The Wisconsin Badgers baseball team was the varsity intercollegiate athletic team of the University of Wisconsin–Madison in Madison, Wisconsin, United States. The team competed in NCAA Division I and were members of the Big Ten Conference. The school's first baseball team was fielded in 1900. The baseball program was discontinued at the conclusion of the 1991 season.

History

Big Ten Conference championships

It won the Big Ten Conference championships in 1902, 1912, 1930, 1946, 1950*.

From 1952 until the time the program was suspended, Wisconsin played their home games at Guy Lowman Field, which was named for the program's coach during the 1918 season.  He was also a professor, and the football and basketball coach at one point for the university.  The newer field was built in 1971 and became the home of the softball program when they first took the field in 1996.

Year-by-year results

Major League Baseball
Wisconsin has had 38 Major League Baseball Draft selections since the draft began in 1965.

References